Naša ognjišta is a Bosnian-Croat, Roman Catholic, weekly newspaper published by the Franciscan province of the Roman Catholic Diocese of Mostar-Duvno in Herzegovina.

The newspaper is also distributed among the Croatian diaspora worldwide. The newspaper is printed in Franjo Kluz Printing House in Omiš, Croatia.

The newspaper was not published during the Bosnian War but was renewed following its ending in 1995.

Notable contributors include Jozo Mašić, Ante Matić, Nenad Mirko Novaković, Fabijan Lovrić, Bazilije Pandžić...

References 

Croats of Bosnia and Herzegovina
Newspapers published in Bosnia and Herzegovina
Tomislavgrad
Catholic newspapers
Croatian-language newspapers